Heteromicta melanomochla is a species of snout moth in the genus Heteromicta. It was described by George Hampson in 1917 and is known from Australia.

References

Moths described in 1917
Tirathabini